The FIM S1GP Supermoto World Championship is the premier competition organized by FIM on the sport of supermoto racing. It takes place every year as a calendar competition on different locations across the world and it was first contested in 2002. The competition has only one class (S1) nowadays but there used to be a second class (S2) world championship that was contested between 2004-2009 and then it was dropped. The most successful rider in history in frenchman Thomas Charayre with 8 titles.

Medalists

S1

S2

References

External links
 S1 champions
 S2 champions

World championships